Hada is a genus of moths of the family Noctuidae.

Species
 Hada armeniaca Hacker, Huber & Kuhna, 1988
 Hada bryoptera (Püngeler, 1900)
 Hada extrita (Staudinger, 1888)
 Hada fraterna Gyulai & Ronkay, 1998
 Hada honeyi Plante, 1982
 Hada lurida (Alphéraky, 1892)
 Hada persa (Alphéraky, 1897)
 Hada plebeja (Linnaeus, 1761)
 Hada sutrina (Grote, 1881)
 Hada tenebra (Hampson, 1905)

References
Natural History Museum Lepidoptera genus database
Hada at funet

Hadenini